Milan Milovanović may refer to:

 Milan Milovanović (basketball)
 Milan Milovanović (general)
 Milan Milovanović (painter)